Painkiller (also known as Pain Killer) is an avant-garde jazz and grindcore band that formed in 1991. Later albums incorporated elements of ambient and dub.

The three primary members of Painkiller were John Zorn on saxophone, Bill Laswell on bass guitar and Mick Harris on drums. Zorn and Laswell work in the New York avant-garde jazz music scene. Harris was the drummer for the grindcore band Napalm Death. Harris' blast beats inspired Zorn to create his signature style, forming improvisational groups like Naked City that merged disparate genres into a unique scene. Several musicians have made guest appearances both live and in the studio, including Buckethead, Yamatsuka Eye, Mike Patton, Makigami Koichi, Justin Broadrick and G. C. Green of Godflesh, and Keiji Haino of Fushitsusha.

Harris left the band in 1995 to dedicate himself to computer music. Zorn and Laswell resurrected Painkiller and played with Yoshida Tatsuya of Ruins on drums. Hamid Drake joined the band for Zorn's 50th Birthday shows at Tonic in New York City. That show (which also featured Patton as a guest) was released as a live album by Tzadik.

In 2008, Painkiller performed a one-off show in Paris, France with the original line-up of Zorn, Laswell, and Harris, along with an appearance by Fred Frith and Patton.

Band members 
Current members
 John Zorn –  saxophone (1991–present)
 Bill Laswell – bass guitar (1991–present)
 Yoshida Tatsuya – drums (2008–present)

Former members
 Mick Harris –  drums (1991–1995)

Discography
 Guts of a Virgin (Earache, 1991)
 Buried Secrets (Earache, 1992)
 Rituals: Live in Japan (Toy's Factory, 1993)
 Execution Ground (Subharmonic, 1994)
 Talisman: Live in Nagoya (Tzadik, 2002)
 50th Birthday Celebration Volume 12  with Hamid Drake and Mike Patton (Tzadik, 2005)
 The Prophecy: Live in Europe with Yoshida Tatsuya (Tzadik, 2013)

Compilations
 Painkiller: The Collected Works (Tzadik, 1997)

Box sets 
 Guts of a Virgin & Buried Secrets (Earache, 1998)

References

Musical groups established in 1991
Musical groups disestablished in 1995
American avant-garde metal musical groups
American experimental musical groups
American grindcore musical groups
Avant-garde jazz ensembles
Earache Records artists
Tzadik Records artists
John Zorn